SS Dana was a British cargo ship that was torpedoed by  in the North Sea  off Hornsea, United Kingdom, while she was travelling from Göteborg, Sweden to Hull, United Kingdom.

Construction 
Dana was constructed in 1883 at the Blumer, John & Co. shipyard in Sunderland, United Kingdom. She was completed in 1883 and she was named Dana and served from 1883 until her demise in 1917.
She had a steam compound engine driving a single screw propeller and 2 single boilers, a new donkey boiler was fitted 1904. The engine was rated at 178 nhp.

Sinking 
There were 8 casualties, including Captain Anders Rasmusson.

Wreck 
The wreck was discovered in 1982 and lies upright on a sandy seabed. She has broken in several pieces with the crank all open, the machinery lies amidships.

References

Steamships of Sweden
1883 ships
Ships sunk with no fatalities
Ships sunk by German submarines in World War I
Ships built on the River Wear
Shipwrecks in the North Sea
Cargo ships of the United Kingdom